David Robert Nygren (born December 30, 1938) is a particle physicist known for his invention of the time projection chamber. He is a Presidential Distinguished Professor of Physics, University of Texas at Arlington now. He has worked at Lawrence Berkeley National Laboratory since 1973. He has been called "the most distinguished developer of particle detection instruments in the country".

Nygren earned his B.A. degree at Whitman College in 1960, and his Ph.D. at the University of Washington in 1967. He is a fellow of the American Physical Society.

Honors and awards
 2018 - IEEE Marie Sklodowska-Curie Award
 2015 - APS Division of Particles and Fields Instrumentation Award 
 2015 - Aldo Menzione award from Frontier Detectors for Frontier Physics Society awarded at 13th Pisa Meeting on Advanced Detectors 
 2015 - Fellow of the National Academy of Inventors
 2013 - Lifetime Achievement Award from Lawrence Berkeley National Laboratory 
 2008 - Honorary doctorate, Stockholm University
 2000 - Member, National Academy of Sciences
 1998 - W.K.H. Panofsky Prize in Experimental Particle Physics 
 1995 - Distinguished Scientist at Lawrence Berkeley National Laboratory
 1985 - Ernest Orlando Lawrence Award

References

External links
Interview with Alexandro Bettini in Jot Down Magazine, September, 2012
 

1938 births
Living people
American people of Swedish descent
Whitman College alumni
University of Washington alumni
Members of the United States National Academy of Sciences
Winners of the Panofsky Prize
Fellows of the American Physical Society
21st-century American physicists